Ponnamangalam  is a village in the  
Sekkanoorani revenue block of Madurai district, Tamil Nadu, India.

References

Villages in Madurai district